Patrik Andersson (born 30 November 1967) is a retired Swedish footballer. During his club career, Andersson played for IFK Norrköping, Hammarby IF, Enköpings SK and Motala AIF. He made one appearance for the Sweden national team.

Honours

Allsvenskan: 1989

Svenska Cupen: 1987-88, 1990-91, 1993-94

External links

1967 births
Living people
Swedish footballers
Association football forwards
IFK Norrköping players
Hammarby Fotboll players
Enköpings SK players
Motala AIF players
Sweden international footballers